1987 Emmy Awards may refer to:

 39th Primetime Emmy Awards, the 1987 Emmy Awards ceremony honoring primetime programming
 14th Daytime Emmy Awards, the 1987 Emmy Awards ceremony honoring daytime programming
 15th International Emmy Awards, the 1987 Emmy Awards ceremony honoring international programming

Emmy Award ceremonies by year